The Federal Employees Paid Parental Leave Act is a bill for legislation, introduced by Carolyn B. Maloney, Gerald Connolly, and Eleanor Holmes Norton, to provide four weeks of paid leave for federal workers who adopt, foster, or have a child. The bill was stalled in committee.

On December 20, 2019, as part of the  National Defense Authorization Act (NDAA) for Fiscal Year 2020, the Federal Employee Paid Leave Act (FEPLA) to grant federal government employees up to 12 weeks of paid time off for the birth, adoption or foster of a new child. The law applies to births or placements occurring on or after October 1, 2020.

References

Proposed legislation of the 115th United States Congress